John Ruiz (born January 4, 1972) is an American former professional boxer who competed from 1992 to 2010, and held the WBA heavyweight title twice between 2001 and 2005. Ruiz is of Puerto Rican descent, and is the first Latino boxer to win a world heavyweight title.

Amateur career
 1991: Competed as a light heavyweight at the World Championships in Sydney, Australia. Results were:
 Defeated Mohamed Benguesmia (Algeria) PTS (22–11)
 Defeated Miodrag Radulovic (Yugoslavia) RSC-3
 Lost to Andrey Kurnyavka (Soviet Union) PTS (14–20)
 1992: Competed at the Olympic Trials in Worcester. Result was:
 Lost to Jeremy Williams PTS

Professional career
His professional record is 44–9–1–1, with 30 knockouts. Frustrated by years of criticism from the boxing press and fans, he retired upon his second loss of the WBA title on April 30, 2005 (to James "Lights-Out" Toney). Ruiz un-retired in 10 days, after finding out that James Toney had tested positive for anabolic steroids. The official outcome, a unanimous-decision defeat, was changed to a no-contest; the WBA ordered that Ruiz retain the title. Ruiz then filed a lawsuit against Toney, claiming that he had damaged Ruiz's boxing career (due to Toney's use of illegal steroids before their bout).

On December 17, 2005, he lost his title for the first time—in controversial fashion—to Nikolai Valuev. Ruiz lost a rematch for the vacant WBA Heavyweight title with Valuev on August 30, 2008, once again in controversial fashion.

First reign as WBA heavyweight champion

After Lennox Lewis defeated Evander Holyfield for the undisputed (WBA, WBC, and IBF) heavyweight title in late 1999, the WBA ordered Lewis to defend the title against mandatory challenger Ruiz, but Lewis refused. Though he had been undefeated since his 1st round 19 second loss against David Tua in 1996, the level of competition Ruiz had been facing was suspect and the only name he had beaten (to date) was a nearly 40-year-old Tony Tucker.

Ruiz and his management sued, claiming that WBA rules entitled him to a title shot. A judge agreed, but rather than face Ruiz in a bout that was seen as commercially unattractive, Lewis instead fought Michael Grant, considered to be a very worthy contender at the time, having knocked out a series of recognized "name" opponents on HBO. After learning of this, the judge decreed that upon entering the ring against Grant on April 29, 2000, Lewis would automatically forfeit the WBA title.

Ruiz vs. Holyfield
Ruiz fought former champion Holyfield to fill the vacancy on August 12, 2000, losing by unanimous decision (this result made Holyfield the first to win a world heavyweight title on four occasions). Many observers and boxing reporters felt that the underdog Ruiz had done enough to win.

Due to this controversial decision, the WBA ordered an immediate rematch in early 2001, and Ruiz won the WBA title. Some critics still believe the decision was controversial (Ruiz was on the ground for a few minutes after Holyfield appeared to deliver a low punch to the groin). Footage following the match showed that the punch may have been legal, but it wasn't disputed.

Ruiz defended the title twice: a controversial draw in a third match against Holyfield where the press believed Holyfield to have won, and a disqualification victory against Kirk Johnson where the Canadian contender was disqualified for repeated low blows in the tenth round. Ruiz was accused in both the second Holyfield fight and the Johnson fight of faking low blows that actually seemed to be closer to his beltline than his groin (although Johnson was shown on replays to hit Ruiz below the belt several times).

Ruiz vs Jones Jr.
On March 1, 2003, Ruiz was contracted to fight Roy Jones Jr., who at the time was The Ring light heavyweight champion. If Jones was to beat Ruiz in the fight, he would join Bob Fitzsimmons, Michael Spinks, and Michael Moorer as the only three fighters to win titles at light heavyweight and heavyweight as well as becoming the second fighter (Fitzsimmons being the first) to win titles at both middleweight and heavyweight. Ruiz, who said referee Jay Nady "wouldn't let me fight my fight", lost a unanimous decision to Jones and moved back into the WBA's contender pool.

Second reign as WBA heavyweight champion

Ruiz, however, would receive another shot before 2003 was out. As champion Jones was required to face the WBA's number one contender, former WBO champion Vitali Klitschko. Neither the Jones nor the Klitschko camps were able to agree to a fight by an imposed deadline, so Jones became a champion-in-recess. Klitschko, however, did not want to fight the #2 contender, former WBC, IBF, and lineal champion Hasim Rahman, for the interim championship. After David Tua, the #3 contender, also turned down the fight against Rahman, Ruiz, the #5 contender and the only one interested in the fight, decided to accept. He fought Rahman on December 13, 2003, and with a unanimous decision victory became the WBA's interim champion. When Jones announced on February 24, 2004, that he would return to competing in the light heavyweight division, the WBA took the interim tag off Ruiz, and he became an official two-time WBA heavyweight champion.

On April 17, 2004, Ruiz fought the first defense of his second world title. He retained it with an eleventh-round technical knockout of Fres Oquendo at Madison Square Garden. This fight was historic in that it was the first time two Hispanics/Latinos faced each other for a version of world heavyweight title.

On November 13 of that same year, Ruiz retained the belt with a controversial unanimous decision over Polish-American Andrew Golota – among other things he suffered two knockdowns and a one-point deduction by referee Randy Neumann. Ruiz vs Golota was the Main event of Don King's Night of Heavyweights card, it did 120,000 Pay-Per-View buys

On April 30, 2005, Ruiz lost the title to James "Lights Out" Toney in Madison Square Garden by unanimous decision, marking the second time that Ruiz had lost to a former middleweight champion. However, after Toney failed the post-match drug test (for stanozolol, an anabolic steroid), the New York Athletic Commission suspended him from boxing in the United States for 90 days, and fined him $10,000 (U.S.). The WBA banned the aging (then 36 years old) Toney from fighting for its heavyweight title for the next two years. This resulted in Toney's win being changed to a "no contest"—basically, a nullification. Ruiz came out of retirement before it was found out that Toney would be suspended and he would be reinstated as champion.

Controversial loss to Valuev
On December 17, 2005, Ruiz lost the WBA Championship in Berlin to 7 ft. tall, 324-lb. Russian Nikolai Valuev. The official outcome was a majority decision (scored 114–116, 113–116, and 114–114), but it was also a controversial one. Ruiz was convinced that his jab/combination-punch technique had given him a clear victory. He demanded that his promoter, Don King, set up an immediate re-match with the now-first-ever Russian world heavyweight champion. Ruiz's long-time manager, Norman Stone, declared that they would also formally petition the WBA: after all, the 10,000 German spectators booed when the decision was announced.  Ruiz's camp claimed that the Germans booed because they too felt that the outcome was unjust. Wilfried Sauerland, the manager who rescued Valuev's career from obscurity two years earlier, angrily countered that the fans had booed because Stone's in-ring behavior had agitated them.

In September 2006 Ruiz announced that he would be managed by Sauerland. His former manager Norman Stone retired on December 22, 2005, stating that the decision in the loss to Valuev was the last straw, and he would continue to support Ruiz from retirement.

Road back to title contention
After the loss Don King announced his intention to still promote Ruiz. King had become aware of Ruiz after his KO win over the former IBF title holder Tony Tucker in 1998. Ruiz followed up the loss to Valuev with a fight against up-and-coming contender Ruslan Chagaev. In a close fight, Chagaev prevailed, taking a split decision with scores of 117–111 and 116–112 for Chagaev, and 115–114 for Ruiz. Chagaev became the mandatory challenger for a shot at Valuev, whom he defeated on April 14, 2007, to claim the WBA heavyweight championship.

Another comeback
Ruiz faced Otis Tisdale on October 13, 2007, and ended the fight with a TKO victory in the second round as referee Pete Podgorski called a halt to the bout as Tisdale went down for the third time. The bout was scheduled for 10 rounds. On March 8, 2008, Ruiz won a 12-round unanimous decision over Jameel McCline in Mexico.

Ruiz vs. Valuev II
Valuev defeated Ruiz by unanimous decision on August 30, 2008. Scores were 114–113, 116–113, and 116–111. The result was initially declared a split decision win for Valuev. The 114–113 score by ringside judge Takeshi Shimakawa was announced in favor of Ruiz. Shimakawa alerted WBA officials after that his score was intended for Valuev. One of the scorecards had the names of the fighters in opposite order, resulting in the confusion.

The decision was once again unpopular with the live crowd as some booed the outcome, much like the first match in December 2005.

Final world title shot
After petitioning the WBA to protest against the outcome of his controversial fight with Valuev, Ruiz was made the WBA's mandatory challenger to fight the winner of Chagaev-Valuev II in 2009. As that bout was cancelled, Ruiz stepped aside as mandatory challenger so Valuev could fight Cruiserweight Champion David Haye. On the undercard to that fight Ruiz stopped Adnan Serin in 7 rounds. Ruiz, coming in at 226 pounds (his lightest since 2001), dominated his overmatched opponent to retain his mandatory challenge to the WBA belt. Valuev later lost a majority decision to David Haye, meaning Ruiz would now fight Haye for the WBA title, after Haye had recovered from a hand injury. When the fight took place on April 3, 2010 at the M.E.N. Arena in Manchester, Ruiz lost to Haye by TKO when his corner threw in the towel in the ninth round after suffering four knockdowns in the previous rounds. Ruiz, whose face was covered in blood, could not stand up to Haye's greater speed and power.

Retirement
Following his loss to David Haye, Ruiz announced his retirement after an 18-year boxing career. In 2013, he opened Quietman Sports Gym in Medford, Massachusetts, offering both boxing and MMA (mixed martial arts) training to all ages. While all ages are welcome, he focuses on providing an alternative for at-risk children and teenagers in the Greater Boston area. He has also indicated that he wants to return to boxing in some capacity as either a manager or trainer at some point. In 2014, boxing.com ranked Ruiz as number 83 on its list of "The 100 Greatest Heavyweights of All Time".

Professional boxing record

See also
 List of Puerto Rican boxing world champions

References

External links

1972 births
American male boxers
American people of Puerto Rican descent
Living people
Sportspeople from Chelsea, Massachusetts
World Boxing Association champions
World heavyweight boxing champions